Samuel Pomeroy Colt (January 10, 1852 – August 13, 1921) was an industrialist and politician from Rhode Island. He formed the United States Rubber Company, later called Uniroyal and the largest rubber company in the nation.

Early life and education 
Samuel P. Colt was born in Paterson, New Jersey, on January 10, 1852, the youngest of six children born to Christopher Colt (brother to arms maker Samuel Colt) and Theodora Goujand DeWolf Colt of Bristol, Rhode Island. His mother was a member of the large and wealthy DeWolf family, most of whose men made their money in the slave trade and related businesses. Colt's friends and family called him "Pom".

In 1875, at the age of 23, he was appointed military aide-de-camp to Rhode Island Governor Henry Lippitt and was commissioned as a colonel in the Rhode Island Militia.  He would use this title for the remainder of his life.

In 1876, Colt graduated from Columbia Law School.

Career and family 
In 1876, at age 24, Colt was elected to represent Bristol in the Rhode Island House of Representatives. He became involved in efforts to regulate child labor and advance women's property rights. He left the legislature in 1879 when appointed Assistant Attorney General for Rhode Island. In 1881 Colt was elected Attorney General of Rhode Island and was re-elected to three one-year terms.  He served in office from May 1882 to May 1886.

In 1881, Colt married Elizabeth Bullock, also of Bristol. The marriage produced three sons: Samuel Pomeroy, Jr. (1881–1890), Russell Griswold (1882–1960), and Roswell Christopher (1889–1935). Samuel and Elizabeth separated in 1896, and neither remarried. Russell G. Colt married actress Ethel Barrymore.

In 1886, Colt founded the Industrial Trust Company, a financial organization; he served as its president until 1908. Later, it became Industrial National Bank, then Fleet Bank, and was ultimately merged into Bank of America.

In 1887, Colt was appointed as a receiver for the bankrupt National Rubber Company, based in Bristol. He reorganized the company and reopened it in 1888 as the National India Rubber Company. In 1892, he merged it with several other companies he had acquired to form the United States Rubber Company. Later called Uniroyal, it became the largest producer of rubber goods in the world. In 1901, Colt became president of the company, serving until 1918, when he was appointed Chairman of the Board of Trustees.

He was one of the founders of the Rhode Island Society of the Sons of the Revolution in 1896. The following year, he helped found the Rhode Island Society of Colonial Wars, and was assigned state society membership number 1.  
 
In 1903, he ran for governor of Rhode Island as a Republican, but failed to unseat the incumbent Lucius Garvin.

In 1905, believing that incumbent Republican Senator George P. Wetmore was not going to stand for reelection, Colt announced his candidacy. Wetmore eventually decided to run. The ensuing contest between Colt, Wetmore and Democrat Robert Hale Ives Goddard resulted in 81 deadlocked ballots cast by the General Assembly over four months in 1907 and a vacant seat in Rhode Island's delegation to the 60th Congress. In the end, Colt stepped down, possibly due to ill health. Wetmore was reelected to belatedly join the 60th Congress in January 1908. (Colt's older brother, LeBaron B. Colt, would win this seat in 1913.)

Colt died August 13, 1921, of complications from a stroke at Linden Place, the family home in Bristol. A farm owned by Colt was later purchased by the state of Rhode Island and transformed into Colt State Park.

Legacy and honors
 Colt's home Linden Place is now a historic house museum.

References

 Biography from the University of Rhode Island Colt Family Papers collection
 Biography from Rhode Island State Parks

Further reading 
 Hubbard, Elbert. Samuel Pomeroy Colt. Whitefish, MT: Kessinger Publishing, 2005. .
 Reprinted from Olympians: Elbert Hubbard's Selected Writings Part 2, by Elbert Hubbard. , .
 Originally published in Hubbard, Elbert. Volume 2 of Selected Writings of Elbert Hubbard: His Mintage of Wisdom, Coined from a Life of Love, Laughter and Work. [East Aurora, New York]: The Roycrofters, 1922, pp. 26–46.
 Morris, Andrew J. F. Restless Ambition: Samuel Pomeroy Colt and Turn-of-the-Century Rhode Island. 1991. . Honors thesis for Brown University.

External links
 

1852 births
1921 deaths
American manufacturing businesspeople
Rhode Island Attorneys General
Republican Party members of the Rhode Island House of Representatives
People from Bristol, Rhode Island
DeWolf family
Colt family
Columbia Law School alumni
Burials at Juniper Hill Cemetery
People from Paterson, New Jersey